Gaston-Paul Effa (born 1965, Yaoundé) is a writer from Lorraine of Cameroonian origin, also a professor of philosophy.

He is professor of philosophy at Lycée Mangin of Sarrebourg.

Works 
1996: Tout ce bleu, Éditions Grasset
1998: Mâ, Grasset
2000: Le cri que tu pousses ne réveillera personne, Éditions Gallimard
2000: Icône, sanctuaire de la présence
2001: Cheval-roi, Éditions du Rocher
2003: Le Juif et l'Africain : double offrande (in collaboration with Gabriel Attias), éditions du Rocher
2003: Le livre de l'alliance (in collaboration with André Chouraqui), Sofédis
2303: Yaoundé instantanés, Éditions du Laquet
2004: La salle des professeurs, Éd. du Rocher
2004: Cette langue est bien ce feu, Éd. du Laquet
2005: Voici le dernier jour du monde, Éd. du Rocher
2006: À la vitesse d'un baiser sur la peau, A. Carrière
2008: Nous, enfants de la tradition, A. Carrière
2012: Je la voulais lointaine, Actes Sud
2015: Rendez-vous avec l'heure qui blesse, Gallimard
2015: Le dieu perdu dans l'herbe, Presses du Châtelet
2015: Sous l'apaisante clarté, poems. in collaboration with Jean-Philippe Goetz; photographs by Nelly Playa, Tertium éditions

Distinctions 
 Prix Erckmann-Chatrian (le « Goncourt lorrain »), 1998
 Grand prix littéraire d'Afrique noire, 1998.
 Prix de Littérature de l'Académie rhénane, 2012 in Strasbourg

See also 
 Culture of Cameroon

References

Bibliography 
 Adele King, « Bilingualism, diasporas, and Afro-Parisians », Journal of Postcolonial Writing, vol. 40, n° 2, 2004, p. 126-130
 Patricia-Pia Célerier, "Gaston-Paul Effa : essentialisation d’une écriture camerounaise", Fès, 1999
 "Des influences occidentale et africaine dans les romans de Gaston-Paul Effa", in Pádraig Ó Gormaile, La rencontre des cultures dans la littérature européenne contemporaine, Association européenne François Mauriac, 2002, p. 157 et suiv. 
 Odile Marie Cazenave, Afrique sur Seine : une nouvelle génération de romanciers africains à Paris, L'Harmattan, 2003, 311 p. 
 Bruno Essard-Budail, Jean-Ferdinand Tchoutouo and Fernando d'Almeida (dir.), "Gaston-Paul Effa", in Anthologie de la littérature camerounaise : des origines à nos jours, Afrédit, Yaoundé, 2007, p. 223

External links 

 Gaston-Paul Effa on Babelio
 Gaston-Paul Effa on Actes Sud
 Gaston-Paul Effa on France Inter
 Gaston-Paul Effa in Africultures
 Gaston-Paul Effa : qu'est-ce qu'être africain ? in Africultures (5 May 2009)
 Gaston-Paul Effa, Je la voulais lointaine on YouTube
 Lettre ouverte au romancier qui a pillé mon film et trahi l'histoire in Bibliobs (26 March 2015)
 Gaston-Paul Effa : La France est frappée d’amnésie in Jeune Afrique (29 January 2015)

21st-century French non-fiction writers
People from Yaoundé
1965 births
Living people